Thai Lee (born 1958) is a Thai-born Korean American billionaire businesswoman, the co-owner, CEO and president of SHI International, reported by Forbes to be the largest woman-owned business in the US. In 2019, she was the 5th wealthiest Self-Made Woman in America, with the net worth of US$3 billion.

Early years
Thai Lee was born in 1958 in Bangkok, Thailand, and attended Amherst College in Amherst, Massachusetts, earning a double major BA in biology and economics, and in 1985, an MBA from Harvard Business School. She was the first Korean woman to graduate from the business school.

Awards and honors
 Life Trustee, Amherst College
 Former President, Amherst College Alumni Society 
 Harvard University, Dean's Advisory Board
 Distinguished Alumni Award, Harvard Business School
 Ernst & Young's Entrepreneur of the Year in 2012

Family
In 1989, Thai Lee married Leo Koguan, a Columbia University graduate, New York Law School-educated lawyer and the co-founder and chairman of SHI. They divorced in 2002. She has two teenage children. She lives in Austin, Texas.

References

1958 births
Living people
American women chief executives
American billionaires
Amherst College alumni
Female billionaires
Harvard Business School alumni
American people of Korean descent
Korean business executives
21st-century American women